The Thorpdale railway line, which ran from Moe to Thorpdale, is a closed railway line in Gippsland, Victoria, Australia.

References

Further reading
 Fiddian, M (1997). "Trains, Tracks, Travellers".

Closed regional railway lines in Victoria (Australia)
Railway lines opened in 1888
Transport in Gippsland (region)
Shire of Baw Baw